John Wynne may refer to:
John Wynne (bishop) (c1666–1743), Bishop of St Asaph 1715–27, of Bath and Wells 1727–43, Principal of Jesus College Oxford 1712–20
John Wynne (footballer) (born 1947), Australian rules footballer
John Wynne (industrialist) (1650–1714), Welsh industrialist
John Wynne (died 1689)  (c1630–1689), MP  for Denbighshire 1664–79
John Wynne (1689–1718), MP for Denbigh Boroughs 1713–15
John Wynne (died 1747) (c1690–1747), MP for Castlebar 1727-47
John Wynne (1720–1778), Irish politician, MP for Leitrim 1761–68, for Sligo Borough 1751–60 and 1768–76
John Arthur Wynne (1801–1865), Irish landowner and politician, MP for Sligo Borough 1830–32, 1856–57, 1857–60
John Wynne (sound artist) (born 1957)
John Wynne (ice hockey) (born 1971), Canadian player for several teams and leagues
John Stewart Wynne, American writer

See also
John Wynn (disambiguation)
Jon Wynne-Tyson (born 1924), British author